The 1992–93 English Premiership, (known as the Courage League for sponsorship reasons) was the sixth season of top flight rugby union in England. Each team played each other once. 

Bath were the champions, beating Wasps on points difference. Due to a restructuring which reduced the league from thirteen to ten teams, four clubs were relegated; London Scottish, Saracens, West Hartlepool and Rugby Lions.

Participating teams

Table

Results
The home team is listed in the left column

References

External links
Official website

Premiership Rugby seasons
 
English